Mary Elizabeth "Sissy" Spacek (born December 25, 1949) is an American actress and singer. She is the recipient of numerous accolades, including an Academy Award, three Golden Globe Awards, a Screen Actors Guild Award, and nominations for four British Academy Film Awards, three Primetime Emmy Awards, and a Grammy Award. Spacek was honored with a star on the Hollywood Walk of Fame in 2011.

Born and raised in Texas, Spacek initially aspired to a career as a recording artist. In 1968, at age 18, she recorded a single, "John, You Went Too Far This Time," under the name Rainbo. Spacek began her professional acting career in the early 1970s, making her debut as an extra in Andy Warhol's Women in Revolt (1971). Her breakout role came with Terrence Malick's influential crime film Badlands (1973), which earned her a nomination for the British Academy Film Award for Most Promising Newcomer to Leading Film Roles. She rose to international prominence with her portrayal of Carrie White in Brian De Palma's horror film Carrie (1976), for which she received her first nomination for the Academy Award for Best Actress. After appearing in the acclaimed films Welcome to L.A. (1976) and Robert Altman's 3 Women (1977), Spacek won the Academy Award for Best Actress for her portrayal of Loretta Lynn in the biographical musical film Coal Miner's Daughter (1980).

Spacek's other Oscar-nominated roles include Missing (1982), The River (1984), Crimes of the Heart (1986), and In the Bedroom (2001). Her other prominent films include Raggedy Man (1981), JFK (1991), Affliction (1997), The Straight Story (1999), Tuck Everlasting (2002), Nine Lives (2005), North Country (2005), Four Christmases (2008), Get Low (2010), The Help (2011), and The Old Man & the Gun (2018). She received Primetime Emmy Award nominations for the television films The Good Old Boys (1995) and Last Call (2002), and for her guest role on the HBO drama series Big Love (2011). She portrayed matriarch Sally Rayburn on the Netflix drama thriller series Bloodline (2015–2017), Ruth Deaver on the Hulu psychological horror series Castle Rock (2018), and Ellen Bergman on the Amazon Prime Video psychological thriller series Homecoming (2018).

Spacek has also ventured into music, and recorded vocals for the soundtrack album of Coal Miner's Daughter, which peaked at number two on the Billboard Top Country Albums Chart and garnered her a nomination for the Grammy Award for Best Female Country Vocal Performance. She also released a studio album, Hangin' Up My Heart (1983), which was critically well-received and peaked at number 17 on Billboard Top Country Albums chart.

Early life
Spacek was born on December 25, 1949, in Quitman, Texas, the daughter of Virginia Frances (née Spilman, 1917–1981) and Edwin Arnold Spacek Sr., a county agricultural agent. Her father was of three quarters Czech (Moravian) and one quarter Sudeten-German ancestry; her paternal grandparents were Mary (née Cervenka) and Arnold A. Spacek (who served as mayor of Granger, Texas, in Williamson County). Actor Rip Torn was a first cousin; his mother Thelma Torn (née Spacek) was an elder sister of Sissy's father Edwin.

Spacek's mother, who was of English and Irish descent, was from the Rio Grande Valley of Texas. At age six, Spacek performed on stage for the first time in a local talent show. Although her birth name was Mary Elizabeth, she was always called Sissy by her brothers, which led to her nickname. She attended Quitman High School.

Spacek was greatly affected by the 1967 death of her 18-year-old brother Robbie from leukemia, which she has called "the defining event of my whole life." She has said the tragedy made her fearless in her acting career:

Career

1970–1975: Early roles and breakthrough
Spacek initially aspired to a singing career. Under the name Rainbo, she recorded a 1968 single, "John You Went Too Far This Time", the lyrics of which chided John Lennon for his and Yoko Ono's nude album cover for Two Virgins. When sales of her music sputtered, she was dropped by her record label. Spacek switched her focus to acting, enrolling at the Lee Strasberg Theatre and Film Institute. She worked as a photographic model (represented by Ford Models) and as an extra at Andy Warhol's Factory. She appeared in a non-credited role in his film Trash (1970). With the help of her cousin, actor Rip Torn, she enrolled in Lee Strasberg's Actors Studio and later the Lee Strasberg Institute in New York.

Spacek's first credited role was in Prime Cut (1972), in which she played Poppy, a girl sold into sexual slavery. The role led to television work, including a 1973 guest role on The Waltons, which she played twice. She received international attention for her breakthrough role in Terrence Malick's Badlands (1973); she played Holly, the film's narrator and 15-year-old girlfriend of serial killer Kit (Martin Sheen). Spacek has described Badlands as the "most incredible" experience of her career. Vincent Canby of The New York Times called it a "cool, sometimes brilliant, always ferociously American film" and wrote, "Sheen and Miss Spacek are splendid as the self-absorbed, cruel, possibly psychotic children of our time." On the set of Badlands, Spacek met art director Jack Fisk, whom she married in 1974. She worked as the set dresser for Brian De Palma's film Phantom of the Paradise (1974).

1976–1980: Widespread acclaim and rise to prominence 

Spacek's most prominent early role came in De Palma's film Carrie (1976), in which she played Carrie White, a shy, troubled high school senior with telekinetic powers. Spacek had to work hard to persuade de Palma to cast her in the role. After rubbing Vaseline in her hair and donning an old sailor dress her mother made for her as a child, she turned up at the audition with the odds against her, but won the part. Spacek's performance was widely praised and led to an Academy Award for Best Actress nomination. Pauline Kael of The New Yorker wrote: "Though few actresses have distinguished themselves in gothics, Sissy Spacek, who is onscreen almost continuously, gives a classic chameleon performance. She shifts back and forth and sideways: a nasal, whining child; a chaste young beauty at the prom; and then a second transformation when her destructive impulses burst out and age her. Sissy Spacek uses her freckled pallor and whitish eyelashes to suggest a squashed, groggy girl who could go in any direction; at times, she seems unborn—a fetus. I don't see how this performance could be any better; she's touching, like Elizabeth Hartman in one of her victim roles, but she's also unearthly—a changeling."

After Carrie, Spacek played the small role of housekeeper Linda Murray in Alan Rudolph's ensemble piece Welcome to LA (1976) and cemented her reputation in independent cinema with her performance as Pinky Rose in Robert Altman's classic 3 Women (1977). A review in The New York Times said, "In this film Miss Spacek adds a new dimension of eeriness to the waif she played so effectively in Carrie." Altman was deeply impressed by her performance: "She's remarkable, one of the top actresses I've ever worked with. Her resources are like a deep well." De Palma said: "[Spacek is] a phantom. She has this mysterious way of slipping into a part, letting it take over her. She's got a wider range than any young actress I know." Spacek helped finance Eraserhead (1977), David Lynch's directorial debut, and is thanked in the film's credits.

Spacek began the 1980s with an Academy Award for Best Actress for her performance in Coal Miner's Daughter (1980), in which she played country music star Loretta Lynn, who selected her for the role. Both she and Beverly D'Angelo, who played Patsy Cline, sang their characters' vocals themselves in the film. Film critic Roger Ebert credited the movie's success to "the performance by Sissy Spacek as Loretta Lynn. With the same sort of magical chemistry she's shown before, when she played the high school kid in Carrie, Spacek at 29 has the ability to appear to be almost any age on screen. Here, she ages from about 14 to somewhere in her 30s, always looks the age, and never seems to be wearing makeup." Andrew Sarris of The Village Voice wrote: "Sissy Spacek—yes, I'm flabbergasted—is simple and faithful as Lynn. Spacek's face is no more of an actor's instrument than it ever was, but given a human being to play, given a director concerned with acting, she makes that woman exist. She sings the songs herself, nicely, and she has mastered the Appalachian accent." Spacek also was nominated for a Grammy Award for her singing on the film's soundtrack album. She followed this with her own country album, Hangin' Up My Heart (1983); the album spawned one hit single, "Lonely But Only For You," a song written by K. T. Oslin, which reached No. 15 on the Billboard Country chart.

In the film Heart Beat (1980), Spacek played Carolyn Cassady, who—under the influence of John Heard's Jack Kerouac and Nick Nolte's Neal Cassady—slips into a combination of drudgery and debauchery. Spacek was so adamant about getting the role that she pored through over 4,000 pages of research to prepare for her character. Producer Ed Pressman and director John Byrum took her to dinner to advise her that she did not have the role. Spacek was so distraught at the news that she shattered a glass of wine in her hand. After that, Pressman walked up to her with a piece of shattered glass and told her she had the role. He said that Spacek breaking the glass clinched the deal, and they believed she ultimately would best suit the part. The film was released on April 25, 1980, to mixed reviews. Ebert called her performance "wonderfully played" and her scenes with Heard and Nolte "almost poetic."

1981–2000: Continued acting and praise 
Spacek starred with Jack Lemmon in Constantin Costa-Gavras's 1982 political thriller Missing (based on the book The Execution of Charles Horman). She appeared with Mel Gibson in the rural drama The River (1984) and she starred alongside Diane Keaton and Jessica Lange in the grimly humorous comedy film Crimes Of The Heart (1986). She was nominated for the Best Actress Oscar for all these roles, but won her second Golden Globe Award for Best Actress – Motion Picture Musical or Comedy for the latter. Other performances of the decade included star turns in husband Jack Fisk's directorial debut Raggedy Man (1981) and the drama 'Night, Mother (1986) with Anne Bancroft. Spacek showed a lighter side by voicing the brain in the Steve Martin comedy The Man with Two Brains (1983).

Spacek had a supporting role as the wife of Jim Garrison (played by Kevin Costner) in Oliver Stone's JFK (1991) and made a number of comedies, TV movies, and the occasional film. She played Verena Talbo in the ensemble piece The Grass Harp (1995), which reunited her with both Lemmon and Piper Laurie. She lent a supporting performance as the waitress Margie Fogg in Paul Schrader's father-son psychodrama Affliction (1997). She also played Rose Straight in David Lynch's The Straight Story (1999) and the mother of Brendan Fraser's character in Blast from the Past.

Spacek began the 2000s with critical acclaim for her performance as Ruth Fowler, a grieving mother consumed by revenge, in Todd Field's In the Bedroom, which was released in 2001. The New York Times film critic Stephen Holden said of her work in the film: "Ms. Spacek's performance is as devastating as it is unflashy. With the slight tightening of her neck muscles and a downward twitch of her mouth, she conveys her character's relentlessness, then balances it with enough sweetness to make Ruth seem entirely human. It is one of Ms. Spacek's greatest performances." She earned a sixth nomination for the Academy Award for Best Actress, which established her as the eighth and most recent actress to be nominated for at least six leading role Oscars. She additionally won the New York Film Critics Circle Award for Best Actress and the Los Angeles Film Critics Association Award for Best Actress as well as the Critics' Choice Award for Best Actress, Golden Globe Award for Best Actress – Motion Picture Drama, and Independent Spirit Award for Best Female Lead, among others.

2001–present: Professional expansion 

Spacek played unfaithful wife Ruth in Rodrigo García's Nine Lives (2005) and a woman suffering from Alzheimer's in the television movie Pictures of Hollis Woods (2007). She had a supporting part in the 2008 Christmas comedy Four Christmases and a lead role in the independent drama Lake City. Spacek appeared in the HBO drama series Big Love for a multi-episode arc as a powerful Washington, D.C., lobbyist. Spacek narrated the 2005 audiobook of Stephen King's Carrie. In 2006, she narrated Harper Lee's novel To Kill a Mockingbird (1960), which sold over 30 million copies. She received a star on the Hollywood Walk of Fame in 2011. Spacek was featured in Tate Taylor's The Help (2011), whose cast received the Screen Actors Guild Award for Outstanding Performance by a Cast in a Motion Picture.

Spacek published a memoir, My Extraordinary Ordinary Life, with co-author Maryanne Vollers, in 2012. The Washington Post Jen Chaney called it "refreshingly down-to-earth" and "beautifully written," adding that Spacek's description of her childhood is so "evocative that one can almost taste the sour stalks of goatweed she chewed on steamy summer afternoons." Jay Stafford of Richmond Times-Dispatch wrote that, unlike other actors' autobiographies, Spacek's "benefits from good writing and remarkable frankness." The Austin Chronicle Margaret Moser wrote that Spacek's memoir is "as easy to read as it is a pleasure to digest." Biographile Joe Muscolino gave the book a 5 out of 5 rating, saying that it "does not disappoint." Kirkus Reviews was less appreciative, calling it "an average memoir" and "overly detailed" while criticizing its lack of "narrative arc," but complimented Spacek for being "truly down-to-earth." Kirkus added that "the book is 'ordinary' and does not have enough drama to engage readers not directly interested in Spacek and her work" and is "for diehard movie buffs and Spacek fans only."

Spacek became the first actor to appear in a film nominated for the Academy Award for Best Picture in each of the four most recent decades. Each film was released near the beginning of its decade: Coal Miner's Daughter (1980), Missing (1982), JFK (1991), In the Bedroom (2001), and The Help (2011). Spacek appeared in the crime drama film Deadfall (2012). She also co-starred with Robert Redford in his next-to-last role before his retirement in the biographical crime film The Old Man & the Gun (2018), which received critical acclaim. Spacek also had starring roles in a variety of television series in the late 2010s. She starred as the matriarch Sally Rayburn in the Netflix series Bloodline, which aired from 2015 to 2017; as Ruth Deaver on the Hulu series Castle Rock (2018), which intertwines characters and themes from Stephen King's fictional town of Castle Rock, Maine; and as Ellen Bergman, the mother of Julia Roberts's character, in the Amazon Prime Video series Homecoming (2018). She is set to star in Darren Le Gallo’s directorial debut Sam & Kate with Dustin Hoffman.

Personal life
Spacek married production designer and art director Jack Fisk in 1974, after they met on the set of Badlands. They have two daughters: Schuyler Fisk, who was born on July 8, 1982, and Madison Fisk, who was born on September 21, 1988. Schuyler has followed in her mother's footsteps as both an actress and a singer. Spacek and her family moved to a farm near Charlottesville, Virginia, in 1982.

Filmography

Film

Television

Music Video

Discography

Albums

Singles

Awards and nominations

See also
 List of actors with Academy Award nominations
 List of actors with two or more Academy Award nominations in acting categories
 List of stars on the Hollywood Walk of Fame
 List of actors with Hollywood Walk of Fame motion picture stars

References

Further reading
 Crowe, Cameron. "From a Nymphet to Weirdo". The Montreal Gazette. November 19, 1979.

External links

 

1949 births
20th-century American actresses
21st-century American actresses
Actors Studio alumni
Actresses from Texas
American film actresses
American people of German Bohemian descent
American people of English descent
American people of Irish descent
American people of Moravian descent
Atlantic Records artists
Best Actress Academy Award winners
Best Drama Actress Golden Globe (film) winners
Best Musical or Comedy Actress Golden Globe (film) winners
Independent Spirit Award for Best Female Lead winners
Lee Strasberg Theatre and Film Institute alumni
Living people
Outstanding Performance by a Cast in a Motion Picture Screen Actors Guild Award winners
People from Quitman, Texas
Sundance Film Festival award winners